Leslie Owen Fox (4 December 1904 – 26 December 1982) was a Deputy Leader in the West Kensington Heavy Rescue Squad. He was awarded the George Cross for "performing his duty in a most gallant and determined manner'"when rescuing an injured man from a bombsite in Fulham on 20 February 1944.

20 February 1944
Leslie Owen Fox, a carpenter by trade, was a Deputy Leader in the West Kensington Heavy Rescue Squad. The Heavy Rescue Squad was a Civil Defence Service brigade detailed to make bombed out buildings as safe as possible so rescue of any trapped people could be attempted. The squad is usually composed of a bricklayer, a plumber, an electrician and a group of general labourers, all of whom completed a first aid course.

On 20 February 1945, Fox was called to the neighbouring borough of Fulham where a number of houses had been destroyed and incendiaries had set fire to the wreckage. Beneath the rubble cries of a trapped man could be heard and Fox started to tunnel towards him.

Fox had to dig while being sprayed with water to prevent him being burned by the fires around him. After two hours of digging he managed to burrow  and located two people. Fox returned to his comrades to discuss how to extricate the man but his tunnel then collapsed. Undeterred, he started digging again and soon shored up the tunnel which allowed a trained first aider to enter and see to the injured man, who was subsequently safely removed.

George Cross citation
Notice of his award was published in The London Gazette on 20 February 1945.

Sale of medal
Fox's George Cross was sold in June, 2008 and reached a hammer price of £20,000.

References

 Hissey, Terry – Come if ye Dare – The Civil Defence George Crosses, (2008), Civil Defence Assn

British recipients of the George Cross
1904 births
1982 deaths
People from Fulham
Civil Defence Service personnel